The 1923 United States Senate special election in Vermont took place on November 6, 1923. Republican Porter H. Dale was elected to the United States Senate to serve the remainder of the deceased William P. Dillingham's term, defeating Democratic candidate Park H. Pollard.

Republican primary

Results

Democratic primary

Results

General election

Candidates
Porter H. Dale (Republican), U.S. Representative from VT-02
Marshall J. Hapgood (Conservation), landowner and former state representative
Park H. Pollard (Democratic), state representative and Chairman of the Vermont Democratic Party

Results

See also 
 1923 United States Senate elections

References

Vermont 1923
1923, special
Vermont
1923 United States Senate
Vermont Senate
United States Senate 1923